Gogołów may refer to the following places in Poland:
Gogołów, Lower Silesian Voivodeship (south-west Poland)
Gogołów, Subcarpathian Voivodeship (south-east Poland)